Héctor Américo Ferri (born October 16, 1968) is a retired footballer from Ecuador who played as a midfielder during his professional career.

International career
He obtained a total number of six caps (no goals) for the Ecuadorian national side, making his debut on November 24, 1992 in a friendly match against Peru.

External links

1968 births
Living people
Association football midfielders
Ecuadorian footballers
Ecuador international footballers
S.D. Aucas footballers
C.S. Emelec footballers
S.D. Quito footballers
C.D. El Nacional footballers
L.D.U. Quito footballers
C.D. ESPOLI footballers